Yankton College is a former private liberal arts college in Yankton, South Dakota, United States, affiliated with the Congregational Christian Churches (later the United Church of Christ). Yankton College produced nine Rhodes Scholars, more than any other South Dakota higher education institution.

History 
Founded in 1881, it was the first institution of higher learning in the Dakota Territory. The man primarily responsible for the college's establishment was Joseph Ward, a local pastor and educator who is one of the two South Dakotans represented in the National Statuary Hall.

Yankton College produced nine Rhodes Scholars.

Yankton College closed in December 1984, and its campus became the site of Federal Prison Camp, Yankton, which opened four years later.

Campus
The campus was declared the Yankton College Historic District in 1982 due to the presence of a group of buildings designed by architect George Grant Elmslie. Between 1927 and 1932, Elmslie designed seven structures for the college, of which several were built:
 Campus Library (1927/1928)
 Forbes Hall of Science (1929)
 Look Chapel, project (1929)
 Power plant (1930)
 Look Dormitory for Men (1931)
 Conservatory of Music (1932)
 Gymnasium, project (1932)

The college's athletic teams were known as the Greyhounds. The football stadium (Crane–Youngworth Field) is now used as the home field for the Yankton High School Bucks and Mount Marty University Lancers football teams.

Yankton College began football in 1894.  In 1917 they became one of the charter members of the South Dakota Intercollegiate Athletic Conference.   From 1960 to 1980 Yankton competed in the Tri-State Conference with private schools in Iowa and Nebraska.  Yankton returned to the SDIAC in 1981, remaining until the school closed.  The most successful seasons were as members of the Tri-State.

Notable alumni

Lyle Alzado, former professional All-Pro American football defensive end of the National Football League
Rich Bisaccia, interim head coach of the Las Vegas Raiders of the National Football League.
Gabor Boritt, the Robert Fluhrer Professor of Civil War Studies and Director of the Civil War Institute at Gettysburg College
Joseph H. Bottum, 27th Lieutenant Governor of South Dakota and a member of the United States Senate
Amanda Clement (1888–1971), first paid female umpire
Riley Gardner, psychologist
Les Goodman, former running back in the National Football League
Alvin Hansen, Harvard College economics professor
David P. Hardy, co-founder Boys’ Latin of Philadelphia Charter School
Michael Jaffe, TV and film producer
Fred Kirschenmann, professor and leader in the sustainable agriculture movement.
Nancy Lenehan, American actress
Ruben Mendoza, strength and conditioning coach and a former guard in the National Football League
Earl Rose, Dallas County medical examiner at the time of the assassination of John F. Kennedy
Dean Wink, former defensive end in the National Football League and member of the South Dakota House of Representatives

References

External links

Yankton College
Historical article

 
Educational institutions established in 1881
University and college buildings on the National Register of Historic Places in South Dakota
Buildings and structures in Yankton, South Dakota
Educational institutions disestablished in 1984
1881 establishments in Dakota Territory
1984 disestablishments in South Dakota
Historic districts on the National Register of Historic Places in South Dakota
National Register of Historic Places in Yankton County, South Dakota